

Surname 
Maslin is a surname. Notable people with the surname include:

 Bruce Maslin (born 1946), Australian botanist
 Jamie Maslin, British author
 Janet Maslin (born 1949), American journalist
 Martin Maslin (born 1942), English cricketer
 Mikhail Maslin (born 1947), Russian historian of philosophy
 Sue Maslin, Australian film producer
 William Maslin (1848–1924), New Zealand politician

Agriculture 

 Maslin is a synonym for mixed intercropping

See also
 Maslin Beach, South Australia
 Maslin, type of bread; see Rye bread#Multigrain